Fillmore is a village in the Canadian province of Saskatchewan within the Rural Municipality of Fillmore No. 96 and Census Division No. 2.

History
Fillmore incorporated as a village on June 10, 1905.

Demographics

See also
 List of communities in Saskatchewan
 Villages of Saskatchewan

References

Villages in Saskatchewan
Fillmore No. 96, Saskatchewan
Division No. 2, Saskatchewan